David Heinrich Müller (born 6 July 1846 in Buczacz, Galicia; died 21 December 1912 in Vienna, Austria) was a Jewish Austrian orientalist.

Biography
He was educated in Vienna, Leipzig, Strassburg, and Berlin; became professor of Semitic philology at Vienna in 1881.

Works
 Himjaritische Inschriften (1875)
 Südarabische Studien (1877)
 Die Burgen und Schlösser Südarabiens (1879–81)
 Sabäische Denkmäler (with Mordtmann, 1883)
 Epigraphische Denkmäler aus Arabien (1889)
 Die altsemitischen Inschriften von Sendschirli (1893)
 Epigraphische Denkmäler aus Abessinien (1894)
 Ezechielstudien (1895)
 Die Propheten in ihrer ursprünglichen Form (1896)
 Südarabische Alterthümer (1899)
 Die Mehri- und Soqotri-Sprache, Vol. I, II, III (1902, 1905, 1907)

He published editions of:
 Kitab al Farq (1876)
 Hāmdāni, Geography of the Arabian Peninsula (1884–91)
 Tabarî, Annales (in part; 1888)

He was an editor of the Wiener Zeitschrift für die Kunde des Morgenlandes.

References

External links
 
 Detailed biography with portrait at compactmemory.de 

1846 births
1912 deaths
Austrian orientalists
Austrian Jews
Academic staff of the University of Vienna
19th-century Jews